District 21 of the Texas Senate is a senatorial district that currently serves all of Bee, Caldwell, Duval, Jim Hogg, Karnes, La Salle, Live Oak, McMullen, San Patricio, Starr, Webb, Wilson, and Zapata and portions of Atascosa, Bexar, Guadalupe, Hays, and Travis counties in the U.S. state of Texas.

The current Senator from District 21 is Judith Zaffirini.

Top 5 biggest cities in district
District 21 has a population of 807,460 with 567,099  that is at voting age from the 2010 census.

Election history
Election history of District 21 from 1992.

Previous elections

2020

2016

2012

2008

2004

2002

2000

1996

1994

1992

District officeholders

Notes

References

21
Atascosa County, Texas
Bee County, Texas
Bexar County, Texas
Caldwell County, Texas
Duval County, Texas
Guadalupe County, Texas
Hays County, Texas
Jim Hogg County, Texas
Karnes County, Texas
La Salle County, Texas
Live Oak County, Texas
McMullen County, Texas
San Patricio County, Texas
Starr County, Texas
Travis County, Texas
Webb County, Texas
Wilson County, Texas
Zapata County, Texas